Microsoft Forms (formerly Office Forms) is an online survey creator, part of Office 365.  Released by Microsoft in June 2016, Forms allows users to create surveys and quizzes with automatic marking. The data can be exported to Microsoft Excel.

In 2019, Microsoft released a preview of Forms Pro which gives users the ability to export data into a Power BI dashboard.

Phishing & Fraud
Due to a wave of phishing attacks utilizing Microsoft 365 in early 2021, Microsoft uses algorithms to automatically detect and block phishing attempts with Microsoft Forms. Also, Microsoft advises Forms users not to submit personal information, such as passwords, in a form or survey, and also place a similar advisory underneath the “Submit” button in every form created with Forms, warning users not to give out their password.

See also 
 Google Forms
 Jotform

References

External links 
 

Microsoft Office
Web applications
2016 software